Joe Public is the self-titled debut album of American new jack swing group Joe Public. Released in 1992, it was their first album after signing with Columbia Records.

It features their hit single "Live and Learn", as well as the singles "Do You Everynite", "I Miss You" and "I've Been Watchin'".

Track listing
"Live and Learn"
"I've Been Watchin"
"I Miss You"
"I Gotta Thang"
"Anything"
"This One's for You"
"I Like It"
"Touch You"
"Do You Everynite"
"When I Look in Your Eyes"

Charts

Weekly charts

Year-end charts

References

1992 debut albums
Columbia Records albums